Let 'Er Go Gallegher was a 1928 silent crime comedy film directed by Elmer Clifton and starring Frank Coghlan Jr., Harrison Ford and Elinor Fair. The film is based on the Gallegher character from American author Richard Harding Davis' 1891 publication Gallegher and Other Stories. The film's sets were designed by the art director Stephen Goosson.

In the story, Gallegher is a copy boy at a newspaper who become an investigator. The character was also adapted into a film in 1917.

Cast
 Frank Coghlan Jr. as John 'Let 'Er Go' Gallegher 
 Harrison Ford as Henry Clay Callahan
 Elinor Fair as Clarissa Mahaffey
 Wade Boteler as 	McGinty
 E.H. Calvert as City Editor
 Ivan Lebedeff as Stephen B. Hade AKA Four Fingers Dan
 Morgan Brown as Prohibition Officer

References

Bibliography
 Connelly, Robert B. The Silents: Silent Feature Films, 1910-36, Volume 40, Issue 2. December Press, 1998.
 Munden, Kenneth White. The American Film Institute Catalog of Motion Pictures Produced in the United States, Part 1. University of California Press, 1997.

External links
 

American black-and-white films
1928 films
American drama films
1928 drama films
Films directed by Elmer Clifton
American silent feature films
Pathé Exchange films
1920s American films
Silent American drama films